See also Wigner–Weyl transform, for another definition of the Weyl transform.

In theoretical physics, the Weyl transformation, named after Hermann Weyl, is a local rescaling of the metric tensor:

which produces another metric in the same conformal class.  A theory or an expression invariant under this transformation is called conformally invariant, or is said to possess Weyl invariance or Weyl symmetry.  The Weyl symmetry is an important symmetry in conformal field theory.  It is, for example, a symmetry of the Polyakov action. When quantum mechanical effects break the conformal invariance of a theory, it is said to exhibit a conformal anomaly or Weyl anomaly.

The ordinary Levi-Civita connection and associated spin connections are not invariant under Weyl transformations. An appropriately invariant notion is the Weyl connection, which is one way of specifying the structure of a conformal connection.

Conformal weight
A quantity  has conformal weight  if, under the Weyl transformation, it transforms via 

Thus conformally weighted quantities belong to certain density bundles; see also conformal dimension. Introduce a connection that depends also on an initial one-form  via

Then  is covariant and has conformal weight .

Formulas
For the transformation
    
We can derive the following formulas

Note that the Weyl tensor is invariant under a Weyl rescaling.

References

Theoretical physics
Differential geometry
Symmetry
Scaling symmetries